Mohamad Mahmoud Kdouh (born 4 May 1993) is a Lebanese professional footballer who plays as an attacking midfielder or forward for Indian club Bengaluru United.

Club career

Nejmeh and experience abroad 
Coming through the youth system, Kdouh started his career in 2010 at Nejmeh in Lebanon. In 2013, he signed for Lithuanian club FK Sūduva, before moving to Finland at FC Ilves in 2015. Kdouh moved to Albanian club Vllaznia Shkodër in August, leaving in December due to financial issues with the club. On 1 April 2016, he moved to Persela Lamongan in Indonesia.

Return to Lebanon 
Kdouh returned to Lebanon mid-2016–17 season, signing for Safa. He moved to Shabab Arabi on 6 June 2017, before joining Bekaa in 2018. In 2019, Kdouh moved to Shabab Bourj, then to Lebanese Second Division side Racing Beirut ahead of the 2020–21 season. He scored 15 goals, and was the season top goalscorer.

India and the Maldives 
On 15 August 2021, Kdouh moved to I-League side NEROCA. He made his debut on 27 December, in a 3–2 win against Sreenidi Deccan. Kdouh scored his first goal on 7 March 2022, helping his side beat TRAU 2–0 in the Imphal derby.

Following the expiration of his contract with NEROCA in April 2022, Kdouh joined Victory in the Maldivian Second Division on 16 July 2022 for one month; he scored a bicycle kick on his debut the same day, to help his side win against BG Sports.

In August 2022, Kdouh moved back to India, signing with I-League 2nd Division side Bengaluru United.

International career
Kdouh made his senior international debut for Lebanon on 26 December 2013, as an 87th-minute substitute against Jordan in the 2013 WAFF Championship.

Honours 
Nejmeh
 Lebanese FA Cup runner-up: 2011–12

Safa
 Lebanese FA Cup runner-up: 2016–17

Individual
 Lebanese Second Division top goalscorer: 2020–21

References

External links
 
 
 
 
 

1993 births
Living people
Footballers from Beirut
Lebanese footballers
Association football midfielders
Association football forwards
Nejmeh SC players
FK Sūduva Marijampolė players
FC Ilves players
KF Vllaznia Shkodër players
Persela Lamongan players
Safa SC players
Al Shabab Al Arabi Club Beirut players
Bekaa SC players
Shabab El Bourj SC players
Racing Club Beirut players
NEROCA FC players
Victory Sports Club players
FC Bengaluru United players
Lebanese Premier League players
A Lyga players
Veikkausliiga players
Kategoria Superiore players
Lebanese Second Division players
I-League players
Maldivian Second Division Football Tournament players
I-League 2nd Division players
Lebanon youth international footballers
Lebanon international footballers
Lebanese expatriate footballers
Lebanese expatriate sportspeople in Lithuania
Lebanese expatriate sportspeople in Finland
Lebanese expatriate sportspeople in Albania
Lebanese expatriate sportspeople in Indonesia
Lebanese expatriate sportspeople in India
Lebanese expatriate sportspeople in the Maldives
Expatriate footballers in Lithuania
Expatriate footballers in Finland
Expatriate footballers in Albania
Expatriate footballers in Indonesia
Expatriate footballers in India
Expatriate footballers in the Maldives